Craig Heap  (born 10 July 1973) is a retired Commonwealth Games Gold medal winning gymnast, who has represented England over 100 times in various international gymnastic competitions, including at the 2000 Summer Olympics. He has been the English and British champion, as well as the Captain on many occasions. He was born in Burnley, Lancashire attending Heasandford Primary School and Barden High School.

History
Heap began as a gymnast when he was just nine years old, after his parents took him to classes out of simple desperation, as he was very hyperactive as a child, in an interview with the BBC he stated; I was a bit of a tearaway as a kid, always jumping over the sofas and racing around the yard. My sister Nicola used to go to gym classes and one day my mum said: 'Instead of leaping over the furniture, get yourself down to the gym with your sister.

After progressing as a junior gymnast, Heap eventually became professional and trained full time though he struggled for money as the grants from Sport England were not vast sums of money nor was much money generated through sponsorship. A series of injuries only helped to exacerbate his financial shortfalls, as long periods out meant even less money.

Heap had many such injuries throughout his career, undergoing five operations on his left elbow, surgery to both shoulders, calves, shins, an ankle and a wrist. Since retiring from gymnastics, Heap has taken a more media related role, appearing on Blue Peter, They Think It's All Over, Simply the Best and commentating for the BBC on gymnastics, as well as visiting schools around the United Kingdom.

In January 2007, Heap received the backing of Gordon Prentice, MP for Pendle, to build a specialist gymnastic centre for the 2012 Summer Olympics.

References

External links
 Official site
 
 
 
 

1973 births
Living people
British male artistic gymnasts
Commonwealth Games gold medallists for England
Gymnasts at the 1998 Commonwealth Games
Gymnasts at the 2002 Commonwealth Games
Gymnasts at the 2000 Summer Olympics
Sportspeople from Burnley
Commonwealth Games medallists in gymnastics
Olympic gymnasts of Great Britain
21st-century British people
Medallists at the 1998 Commonwealth Games
Medallists at the 2002 Commonwealth Games